Kara Wilson (born 18 June 1944) is a Scottish actress best known for her roles as Patience Heatherstone in the 1964 adaptation of The Children of the New Forest and as Miss Caroline Gordon in the seventh series of children's soap opera Grange Hill.

Career

Acting
Wilson has acted in numerous productions with the Glasgow University Dramatic Society, playing leading roles in Lysistrata, Strindberg's The Stronger, Arthur Miller's The Crucible, and Shakespeare's Love's Labour's Lost. As the Society's president, she ran a small theatre company and took productions to both the Edinburgh and Student Drama Festivals.

Wilson first appeared on television in an adaption of Frederick Marryat's novel The Children of the New Forest. She appeared in several small roles in many television series' throughout the 1960s, appearing in Dombey and Son in 1969 and the 1970 film adaption of Jane Eyre. She also appeared as Helen Smith in Adam Smith between 1972 and 1973, as Miss Gordon the Art teacher in Grange Hill and as Jean Mackenzie in Mackenzie.

In 1993 Wilson co-wrote and performed "The Story of Robert Burns", a programme of songs, verse and anecdotes about the Scottish poet. In 1994 she wrote and performed "The Young Pretender," the story of Bonnie Prince Charlie, and took this production to the Borders Festival in Scotland in October 1995 with her daughter.

As an artist
Wilson took up painting and studied at Camden Arts Centre where she remained off and on for ten years. In recent years she has had several exhibitions of her paintings, including one at the Netherbow at the Edinburgh Festival. In 1992 she exhibited with other artists at the Hooper Gallery, St John's Wood and in 1993 at the Wabe Gallery, Hampstead.

Personal life
Wilson was educated at The Park School in Glasgow, and later majored in psychology at the University of Glasgow.

Wilson married fellow Scottish actor Tom Conti in 1967, and the couple have a daughter, the actress and ventriloquist Nina Conti, born to the couple in 1973.

References

External links
 

1944 births
Living people
Scottish television actresses
Scottish stage actresses
Scottish women painters
Alumni of the University of Glasgow
21st-century British women artists